Millingen or van Millingen is a surname, and may refer to:

Alexander van Millingen (1840–1915), scholar
James Millingen (1774–1845), Dutch-English archaeologist
John G. Millingen (1782–1862), British army surgeon and author
Julius Michael Millingen (1800–1878), English physician and writer

See also
Millingen aan de Rijn